Flannel is a soft woven fabric, of various fineness. Flannel was originally made from carded wool or worsted yarn, but is now often made from either wool, cotton, or synthetic fiber. Flannel is commonly used to make tartan clothing, blankets, bed sheets, and sleepwear.

Flannel may be brushed to create extra softness or remain unbrushed.  Brushing is a mechanical process wherein a fine metal brush rubs the fabric to raise fine fibres from the loosely spun yarns to form a nap on one or both sides. If the flannel is not napped, it gains its softness through the loosely spun yarn in its woven form.

The term "flannel shirt" is often mistakenly used to refer to any shirt with a plaid or tartan pattern. However, 'flannel' refers simply to the fabric, and not all flannel shirts are plaid.

Western cowboy shirts are an iconic piece of clothing that has become synonymous with the American West. These shirts are typically made from durable materials like denim, cotton, or flannel, and feature distinct design elements such as snap buttons, pointed yokes, and decorative embroidery.

History
The origin of the word is uncertain, but a Welsh origin has been suggested as fabric similar to flannel can be traced back to Wales, where it was well known as early as the 16th century. The fabric was called ''Welsh cotton'', and despite its name, it was a coarse woolen material with a fluffed surface similar to flannel.

The French term flanelle was used in the late 17th century, and the German Flanell was used in the early 18th century.

Flannel has been made since the 17th century, gradually replacing the older Welsh plains, some of which were finished as "cottons" or friezes, coarse woolen cloth that was the local textile product.  In the 19th century, flannel was made particularly in towns such as Newtown, Montgomeryshire, Hay on Wye, and Llanidloes.  The expansion of its production is closely associated with the spread of carding mills, which prepared the wool for spinning, this being the first aspect of the production of woollen cloth to be mechanised (apart from fulling).  The marketing of these Welsh woollen clothes was largely controlled by the Drapers Company of Shrewsbury.

At one time Welsh, Yorkshire, Lancashire and Irish flannels differed slightly in character due largely to the grade of raw wool used in the several localities, some being softer and finer than others. While nowadays, the colour of flannel is determined by dyes, originally this was achieved through mixing white, blue, brown and black wools in varying proportions. Lighter shades were achieved by bleaching with sulphur dioxide.

During the 1950s Irish designer Sybil Connolly, inspired by Aran Island and traditional Irish peasant skirts, designed a 'Red Flannel' skirt using red flannel wool.  

Originally flannel was made of fine, short staple wool, but by the 20th-century mixtures of silk and cotton had become common. It was at this time that flannel trousers became popular in sports, especially cricket, in which it was used extensively until the late 1970s.

The roots of mainstream use of flannels in the U.S. can be traced back to The Gardenias at the University of Buffalo in the mid-1980s. The 'no class-lotta style' fashion trend eventually made its way across the country to Seattle. The use of flannel plaid shirts was at its peak in the 1990s with popular grunge bands like Nirvana and Pearl Jam using them as one of the trademarks of their shaggy look. However, few of the mass-produced plaid shirts available at the time were actually made out of flannel. The association between flannel and plaid has led to the use of flannel as a mistaken synonym for plaid.

Types

Flannelette typically refers to a napped cotton fabric imitating the texture of flannel. The weft is generally coarser than the warp. The flannel-like appearance is created by creating a nap from the weft; scratching it and raising it up. Flannelette can either have long or short nap, and can be napped on one or two sides. It comes in many colours, both solid and patterned.
 Baby flannel is a lightweight fabric used for childrenswear.
 Cotton flannel or Canton flannel is a cotton fabric napped on one side or two sides.
 Ceylon flannel was a name for a wool and cotton mixture.
 Diaper flannel is a stout cotton fabric napped on both sides, and used for making cloth diapers.
 Vegetable flannel, invented by Léopold Lairitz in Germany in the 1800s, uses fibres from the Scots pine rather than wool.

Weave
Flannel, flannelette, and cotton flannel can be woven in either a twill weave or plain weave. The weave is often hidden by napping on one or both sides. After weaving, it is napped once, then bleached, dyed, or otherwise treated, and then napped a second time.

See also

 Argyle (pattern)
 Check (pattern)
 Coldharbour Mill – worsted flannel museum
 Madras (cloth)
 Sherpa fabric
 Tartan

References

External links 
 

1990s fashion
2000s fashion
2010s fashion
Woven fabrics
Winter fabrics